The Copa Chile 1974 was the 6th edition of the Chilean Cup tournament. The competition started on April 6, 1974 and concluded on August 25, 1974. Colo-Colo won the competition for the second time, beating Santiago Wanderers 3-0 on the final. The points system in the group round awarded 2 points for a win. In the event of a tie, 1 point was awarded to the winner and no points for the loser of a penalty shoot-out.

Calendar

Group Round

Northern Group

Central Group

Southern Group

Quarterfinals

|}

Semifinals

Final

Top goalscorer
Oscar Fabbiani (Unión San Felipe) 21 goals

See also
 1974 Campeonato Nacional
 1974 Segunda División
 Primera B

References
Revista Estadio, (Santiago, Chile) April–August 1974 (scores & information)
RSSSF

Chile
1974
Copa